Romeyn de Hooghe (bapt. 10 September 1645 – 10 June 1708) was a late Dutch Baroque painter, sculptor, engraver and caricaturist.

Biography
He was born in Amsterdam, and was a skilled etcher, draughtsman, painter, sculptor and medalist. He is best known for political caricatures of Louis XIV and propagandistic prints supporting William of Orange. He was also active as an erotic artist and some of his political propaganda prints can be considered early, prototypical comic strips.

During his career, de Hooghe produced over 3500 prints. He also illustrated books, and his illustrations can be found in some of the most important texts of his period. The Hieroglyphica of Merkbeelden der oude volkeren (1735) was a well known emblem book and sourcebook for classical mythology and its iconography.

According to Houbraken he was particularly good at inventive arrangements of subjects in engravings. He was also a gifted painter and painted large panels for the rooms of the mayor's office in Enkhuizen and a room in the estate of Mattthijs van den Broeck in Dubbeldam. Houbraken disapproved of his dissolute lifestyle however, and felt that despite an enormous talent, as he grew older, he engraved shameful subjects that were a disgrace to the profession.

Contrary to this, the historian Simon Schama wrote in the aftermath of the Charlie Hebdo killings of 2015 that: "The first great modern graphic satirist was Romeyn de Hooghe, enlisted by William III at the end of the 17th century in his relentless war to the death with Louis XIV. De Hooghe obliged with sprawling cartoons representing the wars against the French monarch and his allies as a battle between liberty and religious despotism".

According to the RKD he became a member of the Confrerie Pictura in 1662 and again in 1683 in the Hague. He was engaged to Maria Lansman of Edam in 1673, and their child was baptized in the Nieuwezijds Kapel in Amsterdam in 1674. He is known for decorative borders on large-scale city maps. His pupils were Filibert Bouttats (1654-after 1731), Filibertus Bouttats (1635–1707), Frans Decker, François Harrewijn, Jacobus Harrewijn, Aernout Naghtegael, Laurens Scherm, and Adriaen Schoonebeek. De Hooghe died in Haarlem.

Selected works

References

External links

Romeyn de Hooghe on Artnet
Lambiek Comiclopedia article.
The Battle of Chocim - A copperplate engraving by Romeyn de Hooghe at the Wilanów Palace Museum
Finding aid for Romeyn de Hooge etchings at the Getty Research Institute, Los Angeles. Accession No. P850001. Collection contains 59 prints on 67 sheets. Some are signed by Romeyn de Hooghe, some are attributed to him, and several are in his style or copied after him. 
Emblems Book (Hooghe's Famous Symbols of Ancient Peoples book, full scanned book online in Dutch) 

1645 births
1708 deaths
Dutch Golden Age painters
Dutch male painters
Dutch caricaturists
Dutch illustrators
Dutch erotic artists
Dutch satirists
Engravers from Amsterdam
Dutch sculptors
Dutch male sculptors
Painters from Amsterdam
University of Harderwijk alumni
Painters from The Hague
Dutch Golden Age printmakers